250 Douglas Place (also known as the Garvey Center) is a high-rise apartment community.  It is the second tallest building in Wichita as well as in the state of Kansas.  It was listed on the National Register of Historic Places in 2021.

The Garvey Center was completed in 1969.

From 1969 until 1987, it was the tallest building in Wichita, until the Epic Center was constructed, it still has the most number of floors of any building in the state.

On August 11, 1976, Michael Soles, an unemployed welder from Sand Springs, Oklahoma, set up a sniper position on the roof of the Holiday Inn Plaza, as the building was then named. Over the course of an eleven-minute shooting spree, he killed 3 and wounded 6. The gunman was wounded by police and taken into custody.

The building appeared the 1976 film King Kung Fu (a low budget knock-off of King Kong).

See also
List of tallest buildings in Wichita
List of tallest buildings by U.S. state
National Register of Historic Places listings in Sedgwick County, Kansas

References 

Apartment buildings in Kansas
Buildings and structures in Wichita, Kansas
Office buildings in Kansas
Residential skyscrapers in Kansas
Skyscrapers in Kansas
National Register of Historic Places in Sedgwick County, Kansas
1969 establishments in Kansas
Residential buildings completed in 1969